Generał Nil is a Polish historical film, based on the life of general Emil August Fieldorf, pseudonym "Nil".

The film was directed by Ryszard Bugajski, and was released in 2009.

Awards
 Special Jury Award, 43rd WorldFest-Houston International Film Festival
 2010 - awards for Best Director and Best Actor, 9th Tiburon International Film Festival
 2009 - Special Award of the Jury, 21st Polish Film Festival in America, Chicago 
 2009 - "Golden Sabre" Grand Prize, "Military Cinema" Film Festival, Warsaw 
 The Silver Saturno, Saturno International Film Festival

Cast 

 Olgierd Łukaszewicz as General Emil Fieldorf "Nil"
 Alicja Jachiewicz as Janina Fieldorf
 Anna Cieślak as Maria Fieldorf
 Magdalena Emilianowicz as Krystyna Fieldorf
 Zbigniew Stryj as Major Stefan Bajer
Stefan Szmidt as General Tadeusz "Bór" Komorowski
Jacek Rozenek as Colonel Józef Różański
Krzysztof Franciszek as Lieutenant Kazimierz Górski; investigating officer of UB
Maciej Kozłowski as Tadeusz Grzemielewski
Leszek Lichota − jako prowokator „Klemm”
Artur Dziurman − jako Józef Czaplicki
Vadim Afanassjev − jako Siemion Dawydow
Tomasz Dedek − jako gen. Stanisław Tatar
Grzegorz Wolf − jako Stanisław Radkiewicz
Jadwiga Klekowska − jako Rita Radkiewicz
Wenanty Nosul − jako Bolesław Bierut
Katarzyna Herman − jako sędzia Maria Gurowska
Grzegorz Kowalczyk − jako prokurator Beniamin Wejsblech
Piotr Pilitowski − jako mecenas Jerzy Mering
Adam Woronowicz − jako sędzia Igor Andrejew
Tadeusz Bradecki − jako Emil Merz
Dorota Landowska − jako Paulina Kern
Zbigniew Kozłowski − jako Adam Borys „Pług"
Maria Mamona − jako Helena Błociszewska
Marek Lewandowski − jako gen. Gustaw Paszkiewicz
Miłogost Reczek − jako gen. Zygmunt Walter-Janke
Piotr Rękawik − jako towarzysz w celi zbiorowej
Beata Chruścińska − jako gospodyni mieszkania, w którym przebywał „Nil” podczas zamachu na Kutscherę
Paweł Iwanicki − jako ubek przeszukujący mieszkanie Fieldorfów
Andrzej Deskur − jako prokurator
Piotr Grabowski − jako oddziałowy w celi zbiorowej
Krzysztof Łukaszewicz − jako kurier z Londynu

References

External links
 

2009 films
Films directed by Ryszard Bugajski
Polish historical films
2000s Polish-language films
2000s historical films